Charles Frambach Berlitz (November 22, 1914 – December 18, 2003) was an American polyglot, language teacher and writer, known for his language-learning courses and his books on paranormal phenomena.

Life
Berlitz was born in New York City. He was the grandson of Maximilian Berlitz, who founded the Berlitz Language Schools. As a child, Charles was raised in a household in which (by his father's orders) every relative and servant spoke to Charles in a different language: he reached adolescence speaking eight languages fluently. In adulthood, he recalled having had the childhood delusion that every human being spoke a different language, wondering why he did not have his own language like everyone else in his household. His father spoke to him in German, his grandfather in Russian, and his nanny in Spanish.

He began working for the family language school, The Berlitz School of Languages, during college breaks. The publishing house, of which he was vice president, sold, among other things, tourist phrase books and pocket dictionaries, several of which he authored. He also played a key role in developing record and tape language courses. He left the company in the late 1960s, not long after he sold the company to publishing firm Crowell, Collier & Macmillan. He graduated magna cum laude from Yale University.

Berlitz was a writer on paranormal phenomena. He wrote a number of books on Atlantis. In his book The Mystery of Atlantis, he claimed Atlantis was real, based on his interpretation of geophysics, psychic studies, classical literature, tribal lore, and archeology. He also attempted to link the Bermuda Triangle to Atlantis. He claimed to have located Atlantis undersea in the area of the Bermuda Triangle. He was also an ancient astronaut proponent who believed that extraterrestrials had visited Earth.

Berlitz spent 13 years on active duty in the U.S. Army, mostly in intelligence. In 1950, he married Valerie Seary, with whom he had two children, a daughter Lin, and son, Marc. He died in 2003 at the age of 90 at University Hospital in Tamarac, Florida.

Reception

Berlitz's statements about the Bermuda Triangle and the Philadelphia Experiment were heavily criticized by researchers and scientists for their inaccuracy. He has also drawn criticism for ignoring possible natural explanations and promoting pseudoscientific ideas.

Larry Kusche has accused Berlitz of fabricating evidence and inventing mysteries that have no basis in fact.

See also 

Berlitz International

Bibliography

Anomalous phenomena
 The Mystery of Atlantis, 1969
 Mysteries from Forgotten Worlds, 1972
 The Bermuda Triangle, 1974, 
 Without a Trace, 1977
 The Philadelphia Experiment – Project Invisibility, 1979
 The Roswell Incident, 1980
 Doomsday 1999 A.D., 1981, 
 Atlantis – The Eighth Continent: G. P. Putnams Sons, New York, 1984
 Atlantis: The Lost Continent Revealed, Macmillan, London, 1984
 The Lost Ship of Noah: In Search of the Ark at Ararat, 1987
 The Dragon's Triangle, 1989
 World of the Incredible but True: Ballantine Books, New York, 1991
 World of Strange Phenomena: Little Brown & Company, New York, 1995

Language
 Native Tongues, 1982

References

1914 births
2003 deaths
20th-century American non-fiction writers
American fortean writers
Linguists from the United States
American people of German-Jewish descent
American writers on paranormal topics
Ancient astronauts proponents
Atlantis proponents
Parapsychologists
Pseudohistorians
Bermuda Triangle
United States Army soldiers
Writers from New York (state)
Yale University alumni
20th-century linguists